Murph the Surf was the second independent album by singer-songwriter Elliott Murphy and was distributed widely throughout Europe on Disc AZ in France and CBS Records in Sweden.

Track listing
All tracks composed by Elliott Murphy

"Continental Kinda Girl"
"Off The Shelf"
"Baby I've Been Thinkin'"
"Modern Romance"
"You've Got It Made"
"Fall of Saigon"
"Dusty Roses"
"Calling on Cathleen"
"Garden City" 
"Blue Towers"

Personnel
Elliott Murphy – vocals, guitar, harmonica, keyboards
Tony Machine – drums
Ernie Brooks – bass
Richard Sohl – keyboards
Jesse Chamberlain – drums
Peter Gordon  – saxophone, synthesizer
Technical
Michael Ewing - engineer
Charlie Hunter - cover art and design

References

1982 albums
Elliott Murphy albums